Croatia recognizes life partnerships for same-sex couples through the Life Partnership Act, making same-sex couples equal to married couples in almost all of its aspects. The Act also recognizes and defines unregistered same-sex relationships as informal life partners, thus making them equal to registered life partnerships after they have been cohabiting for a minimum of 3 years. Croatia first recognized same-sex couples in 2003 through a law on unregistered same-sex unions, which was later replaced by the Life Partnership Act. The Croatian Parliament passed the new law on 15 July 2014, taking effect in two stages (5 August 2014 and 1 September 2014). Following a 2013 referendum, the Constitution of Croatia has limited marriage to opposite-sex couples.

Unregistered cohabitation
In 2003, one year after the first gay pride in Croatia, the then ruling coalition, consisting of mostly centre-left parties, passed a law on same-sex unions. Initially, the law recognized registered partnerships with most of the rights enjoyed by heterosexual couples, but the right-wing Croatian Peasant Party, which was the only right-wing party of the coalition, threatened to leave the coalition should they insist on this version of the law. The law grants same-sex partners who have been cohabiting for at least 3 years similar rights enjoyed by unmarried cohabiting opposite-sex partners in terms of inheritance and financial support, but not the right to adopt children or any other right included in family law. Registering those relationship is not allowed, nor are rights in terms of tax, joint properties, health insurance, pensions, etc., included.

Registered partnership

In early 2006, the Croatian Parliament rejected a registered partnership bill proposed by Šime Lučin (SDP) and Independent Ivo Banac with 76 votes for, 22 against and 5 abstained. MP Lucija Čikeš, a member of the then ruling HDZ, called for the proposal to be dropped because "all universe is heterosexual, from an atom and the smallest particle, from a fly to an elephant". Another HDZ MP objected on grounds that "85% of the population considers itself Catholic and the Church is against heterosexual and homosexual equality". Medical and psychological professionals did not support these statements, arguing that all members of Parliament have a duty to vote according to the Constitution of Croatia, which bans discrimination.

Life Partnership Act
On 11 May 2012, Croatian Prime Minister Zoran Milanović announced further expansion of rights for same-sex couples. At that point, it was not known which of the well-known terms such as civil union or registered partnership would be used, but it was certain that Croatian family law would not be modified for this purpose, but rather a new law dealing with the issue would be introduced, thus implying that the term marriage would not be used.

On the International Day Against Homophobia, Transphobia and Biphobia in 2012, LGBT rights groups met with Minister of Administration Arsen Bauk, who announced further changes in existing laws to expand LGBT rights, as well as a new law regulating same-sex partnerships. The name of the law at that point was still unknown, but one of the proposed drafts was the Life Partnership Act. Minister Bauk also said that he strongly believes in equality and that no politician should make compromises, referring to several politicians who have expressed support for equality, but are willing to make concessions because society might not be ready for certain changes. Marko Jurčić from Zagreb Pride said that they disliked the idea of these partnerships being called "same-sex" and preferred the term "life partnership", open to all couples, but that was rejected. Zagreb Pride, however, remained a strong supporter of the Life Partnership Act, co-drafting the bill within the government working group and led a campaign called "It's time for the life partnerships".

The Ministry of Administration and the working group responsible for creating the law met for the first time on 6 September 2012, with expectations for the law to be presented before the Croatian Parliament sometime in 2013. On 16 November 2012, president of the working group Jagoda Botički confirmed that same-sex couples would be able to register their relationships at register offices, the same as for heterosexual couples, but the law would not include heterosexual couples. She said that the group was in the process of creating a list of rights with the help of several government ministries. LGBT associations, Iskorak and Kontra, expressed their satisfaction with the fact that registration at register offices would be possible, but at the same time expressed disappointment with same-sex couples being excluded from family law, thus making it possible for the law to include fewer rights than expected as a result of political trade and concessions. This would especially affect same-sex families with children, as it was the most controversial area for the opponents of the law.

On 2 August 2013, Bauk confirmed that the name of the law would be the Life Partnership Act, that registration of life partnerships would be identical to marriage, and that the law should make same-sex couples equal to married couples, apart from adoptions. However, he did say that stepchild adoption is being considered. HNS MPs support full adoption. Public debate about the law was announced for September that year, and the introduction of the law before the Parliament by the end of it.

On 4 November 2013, the first draft of the law was published. Although it would not allow for a full joint adoption, a parent's life partner may attain partial, in some cases full, parental responsibility over the child (similar to stepchild adoption). The Act also enables a parent's life partner to become a partner-guardian. Partner-guardianship is thus similar to stepchild adoption. Even though the draft was not part of Croatian family law, it referred to it, and defined same-sex couples as family. The draft also banned any present and future discrimination, and every future change of family law regarding marriage must include life partnerships as well.

On 12 December 2013, the Croatian Government passed the proposed bill. On 29 January 2014, the Parliamentary Committee on Human and National Minority Rights passed it as well, with 6 members in favor and 2 against (who were both members of HDZ). 5 days before this decision, the Gender Equality Committee also accepted the law. The decision was unanimous, but members of HDZ were absent. The pattern was followed by every other parliamentary committee that had to accept the bill. The bill was introduced before Parliament on 27 February 2014, and during the public debate suggestions were made on how to improve the law, with some of them being accepted. The Government passed the final proposal on 24 June 2014. The bill passed its second reading on 10 July 2014. Parliament approved the Life Partnership Act in its final reading on 15 July 2014 with 89 votes for and 16 against. It was published in the official gazette on 28 July 2014, and it took effect 8 days later (i.e. 5 August 2014), except for the part on parental responsibility which came into force on 1 September 2014.

In September 2017, the Croatian Government rejected a draft proposal, which would have changed Croatian family law to give couples access to social welfare benefits, because it only included married couples and not life partners. The draft was eventually withdrawn after protest from organisations and activists. Sanja Baric, a professor at the University of Rijeka, told the Balkan Insight that if such a narrow definition of the family had been established in law, a constitutional review would have likely overturned it. She cited multiple European Court of Human Rights rulings which have defined the family as including single people with children, same-sex couples and grandparents with grandchildren, among other types of families. In November 2017, the Ministry of Demographics, Family, Youth and Social Policy included life partners in the draft.

Foreign partners and partnerships
According to Articles 73, 74 and 75 of the Life Partnership Act, same-sex marriages and same-sex partnerships performed abroad are recognized as life partnerships in Croatia (EU and non-EU). This also includes unregistered same-sex relationships where couples have been cohabiting for a minimum of 3 years. They are recognized as informal life partnerships. Furthermore, couples where at least one of the partners is an EU-citizen can enter into life partnerships in Croatia, even if their country does not recognize same-sex relationships. Should they decide to move to another EU country that recognizes same-sex partnerships or same-sex marriages, their life partnerships will be recognized according to the legislation of that country, respecting the right of EU citizens and their family members to move and reside freely within the territory of the member states. Couples where both partners are citizens of a non-EU/EEA country can also enter into life partnerships in Croatia. According to law experts, this makes the Life Partnership Act one of the most liberal same-sex partnership acts in Europe.

Statistics

The first life partnership was registered in Zagreb between two men on 5 September 2014. Minister of Administration Arsen Bauk was also present, and presented the life partners with two neckties as a gift from the Croatian state. The second life partnership took place in Split on 18 September 2014.

In mid-December 2014, released information showed that between 30 and 40 life partnerships had taken place in the country since September 2014. 22 took place in Zagreb, 3 in Rijeka, 2 in Split and 2 in Rovinj, while others occurred in Pazin and Opatija. In most partnerships, both partners were Croatian citizens, but there were some partnerships where one of the partners was a citizen of another country, such as the United Kingdom, Austria, Slovenia, Japan, Italy, Serbia and Bosnia and Herzegovina. At the time this information was released, no partnership had taken place where both partners were foreign citizens. On 20 February 2015, it was reported that the first life partnership where both partners were foreign citizens had taken place in Osijek between two Macedonian women. This was the first life partnership in that city and also the 40th in Croatia.

Other cities which have seen life partnerships include Kastav, Dubrovnik, Pula, Koprivnica, Opatija, Pakrac, Vukovar, Zadar, Ludbreg, Ivanska, Nova Rača, Nova Gradiška, Poreč, Umag and Buje. By May 2015, only one partnership dissolution had occurred.

According to the Ministry of Administration, 72 life partnerships were celebrated in 2015 alone. 38 of those were to male couples and 34 were to female couples. 47 of them were conducted in the city of Zagreb, 7 in Primorje-Gorski Kotar County, 4 each in Osijek-Baranja County, Istria County and Split-Dalmatia County, 2 in Varaždin County, and 1 each in Dubrovnik-Neretva County, Vukovar-Srijem County, Šibenik-Knin County and Krapina-Zagorje County. In 44 cases, both partners were Croatian citizens, in 22 one partner was a foreign national, and in 3 cases both partners were foreign nationals.

On 23 September 2016, it was reported that the first life partnership between prison inmates had taken place. The ceremony was held in the city of Gospić.

Same-sex marriage

Many political parties and politicians have expressed support for same-sex marriage in Croatia. Most notably MPs from the SDP, HNS, HSLS, Green List and the Labour Party, as well as Vesna Pusić and Mirela Holy and former Croatian President Ivo Josipović. In May 2013, a conservative civil initiative group "In the name of the family" collected more than 700,000 signatures for a referendum which would constitutionally define marriage as "a union between a woman and a man". They needed a minimum of 450,000 signatures, representing 10% of registered voters. The Kukuriku Government disapproved of the possible referendum, accusing the Church of being the main force behind the initiative. The Catholic Church had a major role in collecting signatures as many volunteers were based in front of churches. The Government also argued that the referendum question was in fact unconstitutional. The initiative had divided Croatian society and opened many legal questions, such as a reform to the law on referendums. According to the current law, turnout is not a condition for a successful referendum, thus enabling a minority of voters to change the Constitution. Marriage being defined as a union between a woman and a man does not prevent the Government from expanding rights to same-sex couples, and equalizing their relationships with marriage, thus raising questions on the purpose of the referendum. According to a poll that included 1,300 people, 55.3% of them supported the initiative, and 31.1% did not. Croatian President Ivo Josipović condemned the referendum.

Parliament voted in favour of not presenting the referendum proposal before the Constitutional Court. However, after Parliament had set the date for the referendum, every Croatian citizen had the right to do so. As such, 3 NGOs (Zagreb Pride, Centre For Civil Courage, and CroL) presented their case before the Court. The Constitutional Court did not decide in their favour, stating there was no legal basis for banning the referendum. However, the Court was clear in stating that defining marriage as a union between a woman and a man must not have any negative effect on future laws regarding same-sex couples or non-married opposite-sex couples. Conservative ex-Prime Minister, once a member of right-wing HDZ and now an independent MP, Jadranka Kosor voted in favour of presenting the proposal before the Constitutional Court and voted against the proposed constitutional change. This statement was not in line with her previous views on homosexuality and same-sex marriages. She was known for being against the expansion of rights for same-sex couples in the past, and was voted the "homophobe of the year" in 2010 after stating that homosexuality is not natural, and that same-sex marriages should never be legal. She does, however, support the Life Partnership Act.

There was much resistance to the referendum in Croatia, with some media outlets, such as daily newspaper Jutarnji list, donating its advertising space to several organisations opposed to the referendum. Aside from well-known public figures who were openly against the referendum, the Jewish Community in Zagreb and a Lutheran church were two religious organisations who also publicly opposed it. Popular Croatian entertainers including Severina, TBF and Let 3 organised a concert gathering thousands of people in support of same-sex marriage on the Ban Jelačić Square. Croatian psychologists and psychology students organised a petition in support of same-sex marriage. On 30 November 2013, one day before the referendum, around a thousand people marched in the city of Zagreb in support of same-sex marriage. Marches of support also took place in Pula, Split and Rijeka gathering hundreds of people.

The referendum took place on 1 December 2013. 65.87% voted in favour of the constitutional change, and 33.51% voted against. Turnout was low, only 37.9% of the people participated. However, not all counties voted in favour of the amendment. Istria and Primorje-Gorski Kotar voted against, with 58.23% and 53.30% respectively. When it came to larger cities, Rijeka voted against with 59.27%, and Pula voted against with 63.64%. Most cities in these two counties voted against, with Labin being the highest at 70.97%. Regarding cities outside these two counties, Varaždin and Čakovec also voted against with 56.94% and 58.95% respectively. Zagreb voted 55.90% in favour and 43.50% against; the remaining votes being invalid.

Article 61 now reads:

In the aftermath of the referendum, the Croatian Government, with the support of some opposition parties, started working on changes to the Constitution and the referendum process. The section referring to referendums would clearly define what questions can or cannot be subject to referendums. Furthermore, if citizens want to change the Constitution, turnout must be over 50%. Constitutional changes currently require support from two-thirds of MPs. Croatian President Ivo Josipović suggested that other forms of family life outside marriage should also be protected by the Constitution to balance the injustice created by the referendum on marriage, but his proposal was rejected. In May 2018, the Social Democratic Party launched an initiative to amend the Constitution to prevent referendums designed with "reducing fundamental civil rights and freedoms".

In April 2018, the Croatian Parliament ratified (in a 110-30 vote) the Council of Europe Convention on preventing and combating violence against women and domestic violence (also known as the Istanbul Convention). The treaty aims to safeguard the rights of women against domestic violence, protect victims of domestic violence and prosecute the offenders. Right-wing groups and the Catholic Church opposed the ratification, erroneously believing it would legalise same-sex marriage.

LGBT parenting
Full adoption (both stepchild and joint adoptions) for same-sex couples in Croatia is legal since 2022, and a single person regardless of sexual orientation is allowed to adopt. The Life Partnership Act implemented in 2014 also recognizes an institution similar to stepchild adoption called "partner-guardianship". Same-sex couples have been allowed to foster care since 2020.

A life partner who is not the biological parent of their partner's child or children can gain parental responsibilities on a temporary or permanent basis. During a life partnership, the parent can temporarily entrust their life partner, who is not the biological parent, with parental rights. Should those rights last over 30 days, the decision must be certified with the solicitor. In this situation, as long as the parental rights last, the parent and the life partner must agree on decisions important for the child's/children's well-being. In case of a dissolution of a life partnership, the partner who is not the biological parent can maintain personal relationships with the child or children, should the court decide it is in their best interest. Partner-guardianship is an institution created within the Life Partnership Act that enables a life partner who is not the biological parent to gain permanent parental rights, and is similar to stepchild adoption. Such a relationship between the non-parent life partner and the child may be established under two conditions; if the child's or children's parent is deceased, under condition that a second parent is also deceased, or his/her parental rights have been terminated due to child abuse. Alternately, if a parent is alive, but a second parent is unknown, deceased or his/her parental rights have been terminated, the life partner who is not the biological parent can become a partner-guardian if the court decides in their favour. Both formal and informal life partners are eligible to partner-guardianship. The partner-guardian receives full parental responsibility as is the case with stepchild adoption, and is registered in the child's birth certificate as their partner-guardian. Partner-guardianship is a permanent next-of-kin relationship with all the rights, responsibilities and legal impacts as that of a parent and a child. On 13 July 2015, it was reported that the first case of partner-guardianship had been granted.

History
In May 2012, Deputy Prime Minister and Minister of Social Welfare Policy and Youth Milanka Opačić expressed support for LGBT parenting and said that Croatia should progress to the point where it is acceptable and tolerated "but not just yet as the current situation could lead to discrimination of children from those families", arguing for taking a step-by-step approach regarding LGBT rights. However, her statements were not welcomed by some NGOs who stated that there are already children in Croatia living with same-sex families and those families are desperate for legal solutions to their everyday problems; "so she should not be perpetuating discriminatory policies, but rather help to create acceptable solutions and fight against discrimination."

Vesna Pusić has long been a supporter for full LGBT parenting. In July 2012, Minister of War Veterans and member of the SDP Predrag Matić also expressed his support for adoption and said that society should not falter in achieving equal rights due to pressure from right-wing and radical circles. This was seen as a major step considering that war veteran associations are usually associated with right-wing politics. Minister of Economy Ivan Vrdoljak said that adoption should be allowed and expressed his hope that the Kukuriku Government would introduce it by the end of their mandate, which expired in 2015.

In July 2014, the Government passed the Life Partnership Act with a majority of MPs in the Croatian Parliament voting in favor. For the first time in Croatia, this made unmarried opposite-sex couples equal to married couples, including in adoption. This was seen by some as the first step towards full adoption rights, even though the Life Partnership Act is not part of Croatian family law. Barrister Sanja Bezbradica Jelavić and professor at the University of Rijeka Sanja Barić pointed out that the European Court of Human Rights does not suggest same-sex couples have to be equal to married couples, but it does, however, suggest that they must be equal to unmarried couples. They referred to the X and Others v. Austria case in which the court decided that the partner in a same-sex union has the right to adopt his or her partner's biological child as the same was possible for unmarried opposite-sex couples. They pointed out that following this decision and logic it is only a matter of time until same-sex couples are allowed to fully adopt in Croatia. Two options are possible; this question can be introduced before the Constitutional Court, and if that proves to be unsuccessful the next step would be the European Court of Human Rights, which would issue a binding decision on Croatia. Minister of Administration Arsen Bauk has said that the Government has no intentions of changing the Life Partnership Act at this point, and it would leave this question for future parliamentary debates.

In May 2017, it was reported that a male couple in a life partnership had filed suit after being denied the ability to foster a child, based on the fact that Croatian law does not provide life partnerships with full adoption rights. Previously, the couple had successfully completed a course preparing potential parents for adoption. Despite Croatia not explicitly providing full adoption rights to couples in life partnerships, the couple, and their lawyer, Sanja Bezbradica Jelavić, argued that the Life Partnership Act and the Family Code specifically state that couples in life partnerships must be equal to married couples. Furthermore, the Act states that any issues regarding children that are not defined by the partner-guardian institution will be dealt with by the Family Code. The couple and their lawyer also confirmed that, in the case of an unsatisfactory verdict, they would bring their case before the European Court of Human Rights. The couple brought their case to an administrative court, and on 20 December 2019 the court ruled in their favour. The Zagreb Administrative Court ruled that the couple have the right to be foster parents. Their attorney Sanja Bezbradica Jelavić stated: "The court's decision is binding, and an appeal is not allowed, so this judgment is final. The written ruling has not yet arrived, but as stated during the announcement, the court accepted our argument in the lawsuit, based on Croatian regulations and the European Convention on Human Rights. As a result, the court ordered the relevant government agencies to implement the new decision in accordance with the judgment. We believe that the agencies will respect the court decision." The decision followed the introduction of the Foster Care Act in December 2018, which excluded same-sex couples.

Public opinion
The 2015 Eurobarometer found that 37% of Croatians thought that same-sex marriage should be allowed throughout Europe. A Pew Research Center poll conducted in 2015–16 found that 31% of Croatians supported same-sex marriage, with 64% opposed. The 2019 Eurobarometer found that 39% of Croatians thought same-sex marriage should be allowed throughout Europe, 55% were against.

See also
 LGBT rights in Croatia
 Recognition of same-sex unions in Europe

Notes

References

External links
 
 

LGBT rights in Croatia
Croatia